Marlon is a masculine given name. According to the Oxford Dictionary of First Names, the popularity of Marlon Brando led to general awareness of the name (his father was also named Marlon), though the origin of the name is not known.  Speculation places the name's origin in France as a derivative of Marc.

The name may refer to:

Given name or nickname

Arts and entertainment
Marlon Brando (1924–2004), American actor
Marlon Jackson (born 1957), American singer, a member of The Jackson 5
Marlon Klein (born 1957), German music producer
Marlon Riggs (1957–1994), American filmmaker, educator, poet and gay rights activist
Marley Marl (born 1962), American rapper
Marlon Mullen (born 1964), American painter
Marlon James (novelist) (born 1970), Jamaican writer, winner of the 2015 Man Booker Prize
Marlon Jordan (born 1970), American jazz trumpeter, composer and bandleader
 Marlon Fletcher (1971–2003), American rapper and hip hopper known by his stage name Big DS
Marlon Wayans (born 1972), American actor and writer
Marlon Abela (born 1975), Lebanese restaurateur
Marlon Forrester (born 1976), Guyanese painter
Marlon Fernández (born 1977), Cuban salsa singer, winner of the third season of Objetivo Fama
Marlon Kittel (born 1983), German actor
Marlon Davis (comedian) (born 1983), British stand-up comedian
Marlon Roudette (born 1983), British Vincentian singer, songwriter and rapper
Marlon Knauer (born 1987), German singer, known professional as Marlon
Marlon Blue (born 1988), Austrian actor
Marlon Chaplin (born 1989), Canadian musician
Marlon Motlop (born 1990), musician, aka MARLON (former AFL footballer)
Marlon Williams (musician) (born 1990), New Zealand musician
Marlon Teixeira (born 1991), Brazilian model
Marlon Craft (born 1993), American rapper
Marlon Asher, Trinidadian reggae singer
Marlon Saunders, American 21st century singer, songwriter and record producer
Marlon Ramos, Brazilian music producer
Marlon Williams (guitarist), American hip-hop guitarist
Marlon Daniel, American conductor
Marlon Mave (
born 1987), Gabonese Actor

Politics
Marlon Guillermo Lara Orellana (born 1966), Honduran politician
Marlon Tábora Muñoz (born 1969), Honduran politician
Marlon Reis (born 1981), American animal rights activist
Marlon Kimpson, American politician elected to the South Carolina Senate in 2013
Marlon Pascua, Honduran defense minister

Sports

Association football
Marlon Brandão (born 1963), Brazilian retired footballer
Marlon Maro (born 1965), Filipino footballer
Marlon Menjívar (born 1965), Salvadoran footballer
Marlon Beresford (born 1969), English former football goalkeeper
Marlon Ayoví (born 1971), Ecuadorian retired footballer
Marlon Piñero (born 1972), Filipino footballer
Marlon Escalante (born 1974), Venezuelan football referee
Marlon James (footballer) (born 1976), Vincentian retired footballer
Marlon de Souza Lopes (born 1976), Brazilian footballer
Marlon LeBlanc (born 1976), American soccer coach
Marlon Broomes (born 1977), English former footballer
Marlon Felter (born 1978), Surinamese footballer
Marlon Harewood (born 1979), English footballer
Marlon Rojas (born 1979), Trinidadian football player and coach
Marlon King (born 1980), English footballer
Marlon Patterson (born 1983), English footballer
Marlon Campbell (born 1983), Montserratian footballer
Marlon Rogerio Schwantes (born 1984), Brazilian footballer
Marlon Piedrahita (born 1985), Colombian footballer
Marlon Farias Castelo Branco (born 1985), Brazilian footballer known as Marlon
Marlon Antonio Fernández (born 1986), Venezuelan footballer
Marlon Barrios (born 1986), Colombian footballer
Marlon Ventura Rodrigues (born 1986), Brazilian footballer
Marlon (footballer, born 1987), Brazilian footballer
Marlon Araújo (born 1987), Brazilian futsal player
Marlon Pereira Freire (born 1987), Aruban footballer
Marlon Trejo (born 1988), Salvadoran footballer
Marlon da Silva (born 1990), Brazilian footballer
Marlon Bastardo (born 1990), Venezuelan footballer
Marlon Jackson (footballer) (born 1990), English footballer
Marlon Krause (born 1990), German footballer
Marlon (footballer, born 1990), Brazilian footballer
Marlon Ganchozo (born 1991), Ecuadorian footballer
Marlon de Jesús (born 1991), Ecuadorian footballer
Marlon Pack (born 1991), English footballer
Marlon López (born 1992), Nicaraguan footballer
Marlon Duran (born 1992), American soccer player
Marlon Bruno Mariano de Souza (born 1993), Brazilian footballer
Marlón Cornejo (born 1993), Salvadoran footballer
Marlon Sequen (born 1993), Guatemalan footballer
Marlon Ramírez (born 1993), Honduran footballer
Marlinho (born 1994), Brazilian footballer
Marlon Ritter (born 1994), German footballer
Marlon Sierra (born 1994), Colombian footballer
Marlon Hairston (born 1994), American professional soccer player
Marlon (footballer, born April 1995), Brazilian footballer
Marlon (footballer, born September 1995), Brazilian footballer
Marlon Costa (born 1995), Portuguese footballer
Marlon Freitas (born 1995), Brazilian footballer
Marlon Frey (born 1996), German footballer
Marlon Rangel (born 1996), Brazilian footballer
Marlon Xavier (born 1997), Brazilian footballer
Marlon Evans (born 1997), Guamanian footballer
Marlon Versteeg (born 1997), Dutch footballer
Marlon Vargas (born 2001), American soccer player

Other sports
Marlon Redmond (born 1955), American former National Basketball Association player
Marlon Williams (athlete) (born 1956), US Virgin Islands long-distance runner
Marlon Starling (born 1959), American retired world champion professional boxer
Marlon Singh (born 1963), US Virgin Islands sailor
Marlon Fluonia (born 1964), Dutch baseball player
Marlon Vonhagt (born 1965), Sri Lankan former cricketer
Marlon Mallawarachchi (born 1966), Sri Lankan former cricketer
Marlon Maxey (born 1969), American former National Basketball Association player
Marlon Forbes (born 1971), American former National Football League player
Marlon St. Julien (born 1972), American equestrian
Marlon Kerner (born 1973), American former National Football League player
Marlon Anderson (born 1974), American former Major League Baseball player
Márlon Paniagua (born 1974), Guatemalan cyclist
Marlon Ramsey (born 1974), American sprinter
Marlon Manalo (born 1975), Filipino former pool player
Marlon Black (born 1975),  West Indian former cricketer
Marlon Garnett (born 1975), Belizean basketball player
Marlon Grings (born 1975), Brazilian slalom canoer
Marlon Devonish (born 1976), English former sprinter
Marlon Barnes (born 1976), American former National Football League player
Marlon Pérez Arango (born 1976), Colombian cyclist
Marlon Byrd (born 1977), American former Major League Baseball player
Marlon McCree (born 1977), American former National Football League player
Marlon Muraguti Yared (born 1977), Brazilian volleyball player
Marlon Jansen (born 1980), South African cricket umpire
Marlon Brutus (born 1980), Sint Maartener cricketer
Marlon Parmer (born 1980), American basketball player
Marlon Samuels (born 1981), Jamaican cricketer
Marlon Reid (born 1982), English boxer
Marlon Acácio (born 1982), Mozambican judoka
Marlon Medina (born 1985), Nicaraguan footballer
Marlon Favorite (born 1986), American former National Football League player
Marlon Bryan (born 1986), Caymanese cricketer
Marlon Davis (born 1986), American former National Football League player
Marlon Lucky (born 1986), American former National Football League player
Marlon Lewis (born 1987), South African rugby union player
Marlon Moore (born 1987), American National Football League player
Marlon Moraes (born 1988), Brazilian mixed martial artist
Marlon Richards (born 1989), Trinidadian cricketer
Marlon González (born 1989), Colombian footballer
Marlon Smith (born 1989), American National Football League player
Marlon Motlop (born 1990), former Australian rules footballer, now musician
Marlon Stöckinger (born 1991), Filipino race car driver
Marlon Brown (born 1991), American National Football League player
Marlon Tapales (born 1992), Filipino boxer
Marlon Tuipulotu (born 1999), American football player
Marlon Vera (fighter) (born 1992), Ecuadorian mixed martial artist
Marlon Humphrey (born 1996), American National Football League player
Marlon Gaillard (born 1996), French cyclist
Marlon Mack (born 1996), American National Football League player
Marlon Davidson (born 1998), American football player

Other
Marlon Green (1929–2009), American commercial pilot, first African-American pilot for a major airline 
Marlon Blackwell (born 1956), American architect and professor
Marlon Jones (born 1970–1980), Jamaican criminal 
Marlon Dumas (born 1975), Honduran computer scientist
Marlon Legere (born 1975), American cop killer
Marlon Parker, South African entrepreneur
Marlon Bailey, American professor

Fictional characters
Marlon Dingle, on the British soap opera Emmerdale
Marlon, aka Louis Coltrane, in the movie The Truman Show

Pets
Marlon Bundo, a rabbit belonging to the family of Vice President of the United States Mike Pence

Television and film
Marlon (TV series), American television series from 2017 to 2018

See also
 Marlon Santos (disambiguation)

References 

Masculine given names